Art of Conflict: The Murals of Northern Ireland is a 2012 documentary film about the Murals in Northern Ireland.

Directed by Valeri Vaughn, it was released on Netflix on October 12, 2012.

Premise
The Art of Conflict examines Northern Ireland's troubled past expressed in unique street art.

Cast 
 Gerry Adams
 Danny Devenny
 David Ervine
 Mark Ervine
 Jonathan McCormick
 Bill Rolston
 Owen Thomas
 Vince Vaughn

Release
Art of Conflict: The Murals of Northern Ireland was released on October 12, 2012 on Netflix.

References

External links
 
 

2012 films
2012 documentary films
2010s English-language films